Biryu may refer to:

Biryu, second son of Jumong the founding monarch of Goguryeo
Biryu of Baekje ( 304–344), eleventh king of Baekje
Biyu of Baekje ( 427–455), twentieth king of Baekje